Rory Michael Fallon (born 20 March 1982) is a New Zealand former professional footballer who played predominantly as a forward. He previously played for Barnsley, Shrewsbury Town, Swindon Town, Swansea City, Plymouth Argyle, Ipswich Town, Yeovil Town, Aberdeen, St Johnstone, Bristol Rovers, Scunthorpe United, Dorchester Town. He was also capped by New Zealand a total of 24 times, scoring 6 goals. He represented his country at both the 2010 FIFA World Cup and 2016 Nations Cup. He was born and raised in Gisborne. His father Kevin managed New Zealand over a four-year period in the 1980s. He retired from professional football in November 2017.

Playing career

Club career
Born in Gisborne, Fallon started his career at Barnsley, becoming a professional in 1999 after moving up through their trainee programme. He had just begun to cement his place in the first-team when he suffered a stress fracture of his foot, which saw him struggle to regain his place.

Fallon was signed for an undisclosed fee by Swindon Town in November 2003 after a number of impressive performances against them with Barnsley, which caught the eye of manager Andy King. After breaking into the team he scored a number of important goals in the 2003–04 campaign; including an overhead kick from the edge of the box to secure a point against Bristol City.

Despite the departure of Tommy Mooney, Fallon found himself regularly on the bench in the 2004–05 season. He was loaned out to Yeovil Town to increase his confidence and he scored on his debut against Scunthorpe United. He failed to score in the remainder of the season, but a red card for kicking Huddersfield Town defender David Mirfin in the face meant he missed the opening two games of the following season. After Sam Parkin was sold in summer 2005, Fallon was given greater opportunities to play at Swindon, scoring on his return to action against Nottingham Forest.

He signed for League One team Swansea City in January 2006 for a fee believed to be £300,000, the second highest fee ever paid by the Welsh club. A productive year followed for the striker, scoring 13 goals in all competitions from 48 appearances. This prompted interest from Championship side Plymouth Argyle and they paid £300,000 for Fallon on 19 January 2007.

Fallon had only started a handful of games for Plymouth Argyle, and had struggled to get into the team. He went without a competitive goal at Home Park until 19 January 2008, exactly one-year after he signed for the club, when he scored a second half equaliser against Southampton. It was only his fourth goal for the Pilgrims. The 2007–2008 campaign saw Fallon continue to be a regular bench warmer, but he continued with his optimistic attitude that he can become a first team regular, and even rejected a £250,000 move to League One side Southend United, in January 2008.

On 29 September 2009, Fallon scored the winning goal for Plymouth against Peterborough United earning the Pilgrims their first win of the season after seven straight defeats, lifting them off the bottom of the table. Fallon then scored the opening goal in Argyle's next game against Scunthorpe United which they also won 2–1.

On the opening day of the 2010–11 season, Fallon played the full 90 minutes and was the provider for Luke Summerfield's winning goal in Plymouth's 1–0 win over pre-season promotion favourites Southampton. In November, he joined Ipswich Town on short loan, returning to Plymouth in January.

In August 2011, Fallon signed a one-month contract with Yeovil Town after a short trial and featured in all five of Yeovil's games during that period.

In September 2011, he signed a two-year deal with Scottish Premier League club Aberdeen. Fallon's time at Aberdeen was notable for his performances in the 2011–12 Scottish Cup. After scoring in Aberdeen's 4–0, 4th round victory over Forfar Athletic, he set up Aberdeen's opener in the 5th round 2–1 win over Queen of the South. Fallon then scored both goals in the 2–1 quarter final win against Motherwell to become the Player of the Round. Although Aberdeen lost the semi-final at Hampden Park 2–1 against Hibernian, Fallon's second half equaliser went on to be voted the PFA Goal of the Season. On 13 May 2013 Fallon was released by Aberdeen having scored three league goals in 35 appearances.

Fallon joined Scottish Premier League side St Johnstone in July 2013 on a free transfer, the deal was completed in time for Fallon to play a part, if called upon, in St Johnstone's UEFA Europa League second qualifying round tie against Norwegian Tippeligaen side Rosenborg. On 31 January 2014, Fallon left St Johnstone by mutual consent.

In February 2014, Fallon joined Crawley Town until the end of the 2013–14 season.

In September 2014, Fallon joined Scunthorpe United on a short-term deal. Fallon scored on his Scunthorpe début in a 3–2 loss to Oldham Athletic on 27 
September 2014.

In January 2016, Fallon joined Bristol Rovers on non-contract terms until the end of the season. He made his debut as a 76th-minute substitute, in a 1–0 loss to Accrington Stanley F.C. In the summer of 2016, he Joined National League South club, Truro City F.C. as a player-coach but had his contract cancelled by mutual consent in December 2016.

On 26 July 2017, Fallon joined National League side Torquay United, on non-contract terms, ahead of the 2017–18 season. He played one match for Dorchester Town.

International career
Despite being born in New Zealand and having a father who coached New Zealand at the 1982 World Cup, Fallon chose to represent England at junior level. He played international football for England at U16, U17, U18, U19 and U20 levels and switched when FIFA changed the eligibility rules.

He did, however, represent New Zealand in an unofficial U-16 World Cup in France in 1998 where Wynton Rufer was the coach. Shortly after, he departed for England to be an apprentice at Barnsley.

In January 2006, New Zealand coach Ricki Herbert suggested that Fallon might still get a chance to represent New Zealand at senior level. Herbert claimed that the only reason why Fallon wasn't picked was due to lack of correspondence from FIFA regarding this matter. Fallon had until he was 21 years old to get clearance from FIFA to change nationalities. It found, however, that Fallon did not apply in the 2004 window to change allegiance for over-21s players. This year-long window was made available by FIFA upon introduction of a rule which allows players with dual nationality to switch their allegiance before their 21st birthday. Under this criterion Fallon could not be available for New Zealand.

On 3 June 2009, FIFA Congress passed a motion removing the age limit for changing associations for players who had already played for a country's national team at youth level under article 18 of the Regulations Governing the Application of the FIFA Statutes. This allowed for the possibility of Fallon again representing New Zealand.

In August 2009, Fallon was called up to the New Zealand squad for a friendly against Jordan the following month and the crucial two-legged World Cup play-off matches against Bahrain later in the year.
Fallon scored on debut in the match against Jordan, which New Zealand won 3–1.

On 14 November 2009, Fallon headed home the only goal just before half-time in the second leg of New Zealand's World Cup qualifier against Bahrain, to send New Zealand to the FIFA World Cup in South Africa, their first appearance at the finals in 28 years. Fallon played in all three of New Zealand's finals games.

He was recalled into the New Zealand camp for their World Cup play-off loss to Peru in November 2017. Following these matches, he announced his international retirement.

Coaching career
After retiring, Fallon worked with Plymouth Argyle's under-14 players. In mid-October 2019, Fallon was appointed assistant manager for the New Zealand national football team under manager Danny Hay.

Career statistics

Club
Reference

International goals
New Zealand score listed first, score column indicates score after each Fallon goal.

Honours
IFFHS Oceania Men's Team of All Time: 2021

Personal life
Fallon's mother, Mere, is of Māori descent. He has a brother called Sean and a sister called Bianca.

Fallon owns a business selling ice cream for businesses and events across Yorkshire and Devon.

References

External links

1982 births
Living people
Sportspeople from Gisborne, New Zealand
New Zealand association footballers
New Zealand international footballers
English footballers
England youth international footballers
Association football forwards
Barnsley F.C. players
Shrewsbury Town F.C. players
Swindon Town F.C. players
Yeovil Town F.C. players
Swansea City A.F.C. players
Plymouth Argyle F.C. players
Aberdeen F.C. players
Ipswich Town F.C. players
St Johnstone F.C. players
Crawley Town F.C. players
Scunthorpe United F.C. players
Bristol Rovers F.C. players
Truro City F.C. players
Torquay United F.C. players
Dorchester Town F.C. players
Scottish Professional Football League players
English Football League players
Scottish Premier League players
National League (English football) players
Southern Football League players
New Zealand expatriate association footballers
2010 FIFA World Cup players
2012 OFC Nations Cup players
2016 OFC Nations Cup players
People educated at Mount Albert Grammar School
New Zealand Māori sportspeople
New Zealand people of English descent
New Zealand people of Irish descent
New Zealand Christians
English people of New Zealand descent
New Zealand expatriate sportspeople in England